The 1812–13 United States Senate elections were held on various dates in various states, coinciding with President James Madison's re-election. As these U.S. Senate elections were prior to the ratification of the Seventeenth Amendment in 1913, senators were chosen by state legislatures. Senators were elected over a wide range of time throughout 1812 and 1813, and a seat may have been filled months late or remained vacant due to legislative deadlock. In these elections, terms were up for the senators in Class 3.

The Democratic-Republican Party lost two seats but still retained an overwhelming Senate majority.  As in recent elections, the minority Federalists had gone into the elections with such a small share of Senate seats (6 out of 36, or 16.7%) that if they had won every one of the elections, they would still not have controlled a majority.

Change in composition

Before the elections 
Composition after September 1812 elections in the new state of Louisiana.

Result of the regular elections

Race summaries

Special elections during the 12th Congress 
In these special elections, the winners were seated during 1812 or before March 4, 1813; ordered by election date.

Races leading to the 13th Congress 

In these regular elections, the winner was seated on March 4, 1813 (except where noted due to late election); ordered by state.

All of the elections involved the Class 3 seats.

Special elections during the 13th Congress 
In these special elections, the winners were seated in 1813 after March 4; ordered by election date.

Connecticut

Connecticut (regular)

Connecticut (special)

Delaware (special)

Georgia

Georgia (regular)

Georgia (special)

Kentucky

Louisiana

Maryland

Maryland (regular) 

The Maryland legislature failed to elect a senator before the March 3, 1813, the beginning of the term. Robert Henry Goldsborough was appointed to fill the seat.

Maryland (special) 

Robert H. Goldsborough won election over Edward Lloyd by a margin of 20.45%, or 18 votes, for the Class 3 seat.

Massachusetts (special)

New Hampshire

New Hampshire (regular)

New Hampshire (special)

New York

North Carolina

Ohio

Pennsylvania

South Carolina

Vermont

See also 
 1812 United States elections
 1812–13 United States House of Representatives elections
 1812 United States presidential election
 12th United States Congress
 13th United States Congress

References

External links 
 Party Division in the Senate, 1789–Present, via Senate.gov